Daniil Aleksandrovich Marugin (born 3 August 1998) is a Russian football player. He plays for FC Tyumen.

Club career
He made his debut in the Russian Professional Football League for FC Kuban-2 Krasnodar on 12 August 2016 in a game against FC Rotor Volgograd.

He made his debut for the main squad of FC Kuban Krasnodar on 24 August 2016 in a Russian Cup game against FC Energomash Belgorod.

References

External links
 

1998 births
People from Tikhoretsky District
Sportspeople from Krasnodar Krai
Living people
Russian footballers
Association football defenders
FC Kuban Krasnodar players
FC Tyumen players
Russian Second League players